The 1926 Syracuse Orangemen football team represented Syracuse University in the 1926 college football season.

Schedule

References

Syracuse
Syracuse Orange football seasons
Syracuse Orangemen football